Riadh is a town in Tunisia, near the capital city of Tunis.

Transport
In June 2012, an electrified railway service opened from the capital city of Tunis.

See also
 Rail transport in Tunisia
 Transport in Tunisia

References

Populated places in Tunisia